Francis Ellingwood Abbot (November 6, 1836 – October 23, 1903) was an American philosopher and theologian who sought to reconstruct theology in accord with scientific method.

His lifelong romance with his wife Katharine Fearing Loring forms the subject of If Ever Two Were One, a collection of his correspondence and diary entries.

Biography
Abbot was born to Joseph Hale Abbot and Fanny Ellingwood Larcom on November 6, 1836 in Boston, Massachusetts. He married Katherine Fearing on August 3, 1859 in Nashua, New Hampshire. The couple had three children; Everett Vergnies, Fanny Larcom, and Edward Stanley Abbot.

As a spokesman for "free religion", he asserted that Christianity, understood as based on the lordship of Christ, is no longer tenable.  He rejected all dogma and reliance on Scriptures or creeds, teaching the truth is open to every individual.

Abbot graduated from Harvard University and the Meadville Theological School.  He served Unitarian churches in Dover, New Hampshire, and Toledo, Ohio, but his ministry proved controversial, and in 1868 New Hampshire's highest court ruled that the Dover, New Hampshire, First Unitarian Society of Christians' chosen minister was insufficiently "Christian" to serve his congregation.  See Hale v. Everett, 53 N.H. 9 (1868).  The Rev. Abbot had, it said, once preached that:
 
Whoever has been so fired in his own spirit by the overwhelming thought of the Divine Being as to kindle the flames of faith in the hearts of his fellow men, whether Confucius, or Zoroaster, or Moses, or Jesus, or Mohammed, has thereby proved himself to be a prophet of the living God; and thus every great historic religion dates from a genuine inspiration by the Eternal Spirit.
 
In another sermon, the court noted, Rev. Abbot had even declared that

America is every whit as sacred as Judea. God is as near to you and to me, as ever he was to Moses, to Jesus, or to Paul.  Wherever a human soul is born into the love of truth and high virtue, there is the "Holy Land."  Wherever a human soul has uttered its sincere and brave faith in the Divine, and thus bequeathed to us the legacy of inspired words, there is the "Holy Bible."

"If Protestantism would include Mr. Abbot in this case," New Hampshire's highest court concluded,  
 
it would of course include Thomas Jefferson, and by the same rule also Thomas Paine, whom Gov. Plumer of New Hampshire called "that outrageous blasphemer," that "infamous blasphemer," "that miscreant Paine," whose "Age of Reason" Plumer had read "with unqualified disapprobation of its tone and temper, its coarse vulgarity, and its unfair appeals to the passions and prejudices of his readers."

Hale v. Everett, 53 N.H. 9, 87-88 (1868).

But opinions concerning Abbot diverged widely.  Frederick Douglass, for example, praised Frank Abbot for doing "much to break the fetters of religious superstition, for which he is entitled to gratitude." Letter from Hon. Frederick Douglass to Rev. M.J. Savage (June 15, 1880), published in Farewell Dinner to Francis Ellingwood Abbot, on Retiring from the Editorship of "The Index" 48 (George H. Ellis, 1880).

Following the controversy in New Hampshire, Abbot left the ministry in 1868 to write, edit, and teach.  Abbot's theological position was stated in Scientific Theism (1885) and The Way Out of Agnosticism (1890). On the latter book Josiah Royce wrote an article so scathing that Abbot took it as an unfair attempt to destroy his reputation, and eventually responded publicly with Mr. Royce's Libel (1891 October) in which he sought redress from Royce's employer Harvard University. The debate moved to the pages of The Nation, where Charles Sanders Peirce took Abbot's side; William James and Joseph Bangs Warner, less so. In his 1903 obituary of Abbot, Peirce praised Abbot's philosophical work and love of truth, and wrote that, in the introduction to Scientific Theism (wherein Abbot criticized nominalism and traced it through Kant among others), Abbot "put his finger unerringly [...] upon the one great blunder of all modern philosophy." (For the full texts of the public controversy and the obituary, see "External links" below.)

Abbot committed suicide in 1903 by taking sleeping pills at his wife's gravesite in Central Cemetery, Beverly, Massachusetts, on the 10th anniversary of her death.

See also
American philosophy
List of American philosophers

Notes

External links
 
 Abbot, F. E. (1891), A Public Appeal for Redress to the Corporation and Overseers of Harvard University, Geo. H. Ellis, 141 Franklin Street, 48 pages, Gutenberg Eprint.
 
 Abbot, F. E. (1885) Scientific Theism, University Press, John Wilson and Son, Cambridge (MA). "Introduction" via Arisbe. Third Edition (1888) xvii + 219 pages.
, 3rd edition (1888), via Google Books.1
Eprint, 3rd edition (1888) via Internet Archive.
 Abbot, F. E. (1906), The Syllogistic Philosophy or Prolegomena to Science, Little, Brown, and Company, Boston, two vols., vol. 1, xiii + 317 pages, vol. 2, vi + 374 pages.
{| cellSpacing=0
|-
| style="padding-right: 2em" |
 of vol. 1 via Google Books.1
 of vol. 2 via Google Books.1
||
Eprint of vol. 1 via Internet Archive.
Eprint of vol. 2 via Internet Archive.
|}
 Abbot, F. E. (1890), The Way Out of Agnosticism, or the Philosophy of Free Religion, London: MacMillan and Co, and Cambridge, USA: University Press: John Wilson and Son, via Internet Archive1
 Royce, Josiah (1890), "Dr. Abbot's 'Way Out of Agnosticism", International Journal of Ethics v. 1, n. 1, October, Philadelphia: International Journal of Ethics and London: T. Fisher Unwin, pp. 98–113 via Google Books.1.
 Abbot, F. E. (1891), Professor Royce's Libel: Public Appeal for Redress to the Corporation and Overseers of Harvard University, public letter (dated October 1, 1891) published as pamphlet, Boston: G. H. Ellis, via Internet Archive.
 Peirce, C. S. (1891 November 12), "Abbot against Royce" (letter in support of Abbot), The Nation v. 53, n. 1376, New York: The Evening Post Publishing Company, p. 372 via Google Books.1
 James, William (1891 November 19), "Abbot against Royce" (letter dated November 15, 1891), The Nation, v. 53, n. 1377, pp. 387–388 via Google Books.1
 Warner, Joseph Bangs (1891 November 26), "The Suppression of Dr. Abbot's Reply" (letter dated November 20, 1891), The Nation v. 53, n. 1378, p. 408 via Google Books.1
 Abbot, F. E. (1891 December 3), "Mr. Warner's 'Evidence in Full' Completed" (letter dated November 28, 1891), along with editor's note declining further responses, The Nation v. 53, n. 1379, p. 426 via Google Books.1
Appleton's Cyclopedia of American Biography, edited by James Grant Wilson, John Fiske and Stanley L. Klos. Six volumes, New York: D. Appleton and Company, 1887–1889
 Bishop Quaid and Abbot, F. E. (1876), The Public School Question, as Understood by a Catholic American Citizen and a Liberal American Citizen: Two Lectures before the Free Religious Association in Horticultural Hall, Boston, Free Religious Tracts No. 5, The Free Religious Association, Boston, 100 pages, Eprint via Internet Archive.1
Grave of Francis Ellingwood Abbot at Central Cemetery, Beverly, MA
The family papers of Francis Ellingwood Abbot are in the Harvard Divinity School Library at Harvard Divinity School in Cambridge, Massachusetts.
The historical records of Francis Ellingwood Abbot are held by Harvard University in Cambridge, Massachusetts.
Peirce, C. S. (1903), "To the Editor of The Nation" (obituary for F. E. Abbot), dated Oct. 27, 1903, published Nov. 5, 1903, The Nation v. 77, n. 2001, p. 360. Eprint (scroll down). Google Books Eprint

1 Users outside the USA may not yet be able to gain full access to editions linked through Google Books. See official Google Inside Google Book Search blog post "From the mail bag: Public domain books and downloads", November 9, 2006, 11:19 AM, posted by Ryan Sands, Google Book Search Support Team, Eprint

1836 births
1903 deaths
Harvard College alumni
Philosophers from Massachusetts
19th-century American philosophers
Suicides by poison
19th-century Unitarian clergy
People from Boston
General Society of Colonial Wars
Philosophical theists
1903 suicides